Corryocactus apiciflorus or  is a species of columnar cactus found in  Peru.

References

External links
 
 

apiciflorus